Gladiators was an Australian television series which aired on the Seven Network in 2008. It was a revival of the earlier series of the same name, and was based on the American version of the show, which was also revived in 2008.

The show was filmed at The Dome at the Sydney Showground, and was hosted by Tom Williams and Zoe Naylor. Well known NRL referee Bill Harrigan was one of the two referees for the show, the other was John Forsythe, who was a referee on the original series. Although not credited, the Sydney Altitude Cheerleaders were present in every episode, doing various routines throughout each episode whether an event was taking place or not.

Behind the scenes, highly respected military fitness expert 'Chief' Brabon (head strength & conditioning coach) was responsible for preparing the gladiators for their extremely physical roles.

The revival of Gladiators was first announced on 9 September 2007, and premiered on 30 March 2008 at 6:30 pm. The Challengers in this series competed to win A$50,000 and a new Subaru Forester.

The revival aired for one season. No official announcement has been made by the Seven Network as per the future plans for the series.

Selection
To ensure that both Gladiators, and Challengers were of the highest possible calibre, all prospects were submitted to a grueling physical selection process designed by the shows head strength & conditioning coach 'Chief' Brabon.

The so-called 'Barrier Test' was based on similar selection programs that Chief had designed for elite military and law enforcement tactical response teams.

The barrier test was so successful at vetting would-be Gladiators & Challengers that less than 10% of applicants successfully completed the first event known as the Grunt Challenge. The challenge required participants to do a burpee style exercise (Grunts) to a cadence called by Chief himself. Prospective Challengers were required to complete a minimum of 75 Grunts to pass through to the next event, whereas Gladiators were required to complete 100 Grunts.

Results
Note: Challengers which are bolded advanced through to the next stage. Times listed next to the challengers' name is their runtime for the Eliminator. DNR indicates the challenger did not run the Eliminator due to the other challenger pulling out from injury.

Men

The eventual winner of the Grand Final was Paul Baird.

Women

Winner of the Grand Final was Natasha Haines.

Episodes

Gladiators

Male
 Hunter - Zac Kozyrski
 Kouta - Anthony Koutoufides
 Nomad - Ali Ahmadi
 Outlaw - Jackson Mullane
 Scar - Michael Gore
 Tank - Bobby Tuimaualuga
 Thunder - Derek Boyer

Female
 Amazon - Shari Onley
 Angel - Tiffiny Hall
 Bionica - Stephanie Lethborg
 Destiny - Karen Harding
 Nitro - Hayley Bateup
 Olympia - Tatiana Grigorieva
 Viper - Sarah Howett

Events
 Atlasphere
 Duel
 Gauntlet
 Hang Tough
 Hit & Run
 Pendulum
 Powerball
 Pyramid
 Sumo Ball
 Suspension Bridge
 The Wall
 Vertigo
 Whiplash
 Eliminator

Development
In early 2007, an episode of the television series Where Are They Now? featured some of the original Gladiators as special guests. The Seven Network used this segment as research towards reviving the show depending on viewer numbers for the episode as well as if the ratings fell after the end of the segment.

On 9 September 2007, it was officially announced by Seven that the show was being revived and will return for its fourth series in early 2008. Auditions for new gladiators took place via e-mail and closed on 16 October 2007 while auditions for challengers took place in Brisbane, Sydney, Melbourne, Adelaide and Perth from 20 October to 4 November 2007. Once the gladiators and challengers had been chosen, filming of all the episodes for season four took place from 6 January 2008 to 10 February 2008 at The Dome, Sydney Showground, New South Wales.

Speculation around who was going to host the new series was evident, with many reports in the media about celebrities which have either successfully or unsuccessfully auditioned. Seven Network presenter Tom Williams was reportedly the only male who was auditioned, and was picked up for the male co-host role immediately. For the female co-host role, the process was more intense, with many females auditioning, including swimmers Elka Graham and Brooke Hanson as well as actors Zoe Ventoura and Samantha Noble. On 18 December 2007, it was reported in the media that former McLeod's Daughters actor Zoe Naylor was being seriously considered as the female host, with an insider stating that "She looked amazing in the screen tests and there was a great vibe between her and Tom. She's fresh and fun." She ultimately ended up being chosen for the female co-host position.

With new Gladiators being chosen for the new series, it was reported on 30 December 2007 that former Australian rules footballer Anthony Koutoufides and Olympic Pole vaulter Tatiana Grigorieva were two of the new gladiators for the new series, but the Seven Network refused to confirm the selections, even though these reports ended up being true. Strongman Derek Boyer is the third celebrity to be picked up as a Gladiator, followed by former ironwoman Hayley Bateup being the fourth. The other ten Gladiators have a non-public background.

Ratings

 Notes

References

External links
 

2008 Australian television series debuts
2008 Australian television series endings
2000s Australian game shows
Australian television series based on American television series
English-language television shows
Gladiators (franchise)
Seven Network original programming
Television series by Banijay
Television series by Endemol Australia
Television series reboots
Television shows set in New South Wales